The 2005 Samsung/Radio Shack 500 was the 7th race of the 2005 NASCAR Nextel Cup Series season, ran on April 17, 2005, at Texas Motor Speedway. The race was won by Greg Biffle, who went on to lead 216 laps of the 334 lap event.

Qualifying

Results

References 

2005 NASCAR Nextel Cup Series
April 2005 sports events in the United States
NASCAR races at Texas Motor Speedway